The 2015–16 season will be Peterborough United's 56th year in the Football League and their third consecutive season in the third tier, League One. Along with League One, the club will also compete in the FA Cup, League Cup and Football League Trophy. The season covers the period from 1 July 2015 to 30 June 2016.

Squad

Statistics

|-
|colspan=14|Players currently out on loan:

|-
|colspan=14|Players who left the club during the season:

|}

Goals record

Disciplinary Record

Transfers

Transfers in

Transfers out

Total incoming:  £2,875,000

Loans in

Loans out

Competitions

Pre-season friendlies
On 29 May 2015, Peterborough United announced they will face Ipswich Town and Dulwich Hamlet during pre-season. Also a friendly against Barnet was confirmed. On 8 June 2015, it was confirmed West Ham United will visit on 11 July 2015. On 15 June 2015, the Posh added three more confirmed fixtures to the pre-season schedule. A date for the Chris Turner memorial match was announced on 16 June 2015. On 25 June 2015, Peterborough United announced a Tottenham Hotspur XI side will visit during pre-season.

League One

League table

Matches

FA Cup

League Cup

Football League Trophy
On 8 August 2015, live on Soccer AM the draw for the first round of the Football League Trophy was drawn by Toni Duggan and Alex Scott. The Posh will travel to Millwall.

References

Peterborough United F.C. seasons
Peterborough United